NSDL may refer to:
National Science Digital Library, a free online library
 National Securities Depository Limited, the largest securities depository in India